The Freedom and Unity Front is a political party in Uganda, led by former General David Sejusa. It has opposed President Yoweri Museveni over allegations of corruption and nepotism. It is officially headed by Amii Omara-Otunnu.

History
The government of Ugandan President Yoweri Museveni, which has been in power since 1986, formerly banned other political parties, but in a 2005 referendum, opposition parties were re-legalised.

In May 2013, David Sejusa, who had held important positions in the national government and a former fighter in the rebellion that brought Museveni to power after the ouster of Milton Obote, parted ways with Uganda's establishment and left the country for England. Sejusa made allegations that Museveni's son, Muhoozi Kainerugaba, was being prepared to eventually simply replace his father as president, in effect establishing a monarchy. Kainerugaba denied the allegations, while his father made no public statements about his future plans.

In November 2013, while living in exile in England, Sejusa was removed from his seat as a member of Uganda's parliament due to his prolonged absence. That same month, Sejusa and others announced the formation of the Freedom and Unity Front as a new political party in Uganda. The new party united Free Uganda (FU), Citizens in the Defense of the Constitution (CDC) and other organisations. The October 2013 Uhuru Declaration, signed by the party's Publicity Secretary Vincent Magombe, describes the FUF's purpose.

The week following former General David Sejusa's departure as an MP representing the military, he noted that "no one should imagine that Museveni will be removed through elections." He had further called upon Ugandans to "build alternative capacity" by choosing another leader. He also accused Museveni of subverting the East African Community by marginalising the leaders of Burundi and Tanzania by not inviting them for the body's summits. Sejusa accused Museveni of not only starting the M23 rebellion by militarising the rebels, including offering financial aid, but acting like a "chameleon" in "want[ing] to bring peace." Sejusa had called on Ugandans to "start a new process of national healing" with the removal of Museveni, that electoral politics under Museveni would yield no change and that though violence would not be initiated it could be used as "self defence."   In the second half of 2013, Museveni issued a challenge to Sejusa to bring about a change in government, but also added that he would not tolerate violence as a means to that end. In turn, Sejusa responded to questions of whether he would use force to bring change and said: "It's not so much that we want to do so. But if he continues to unleash terror on the population ours will be self defence."

Sejusa criticised Museveni and called for "a new process of national healing" and that the party was an attempt at organising so as to "establishing a constitutional rule which he destroyed." Yet he denied seeking the presidency for himself as it was "a waste of time" to run against Museveni within the structures of the current system. In a related measure, former three-time presidential candidate Colonel Kizza Besigye also said "whether united or not, you cannot dislodge Museveni through an election he [Museveni] organises, supervises and controls," due its status as a military government. Instead he suggested civil disobedience would be more effective in bringing about regime change.

Issues
According to the party, important issues are: tackling what it sees as a decrease in "human rights," particularly a rise in extrajudicial killings; an alleged "selective justice" on the part of the government; a lack of accountability, transparency and prevalent corruption; and a decrease in civil society organisations in the immediate preceding years. On 14 December, the party launched its first manifesto.

Leadership
The party's chairman is Amii Omara-Otunnu. Former General David Sejusa is also a party leader. The Publicity Secretary is Vincent Magombe.

References

Political parties in Uganda
Political parties established in 2013
2013 establishments in Uganda